Hennepin County Library is a public library system serving Hennepin County, Minnesota, US. The current iteration of Hennepin County Library was formed by the merger of urban Minneapolis Public Library and suburban Hennepin County Library on January 1, 2008. The system has 41 library locations, deposit collections at nursing homes and correctional facilities, mail service to the homebound, and extensive outreach services. The library is a department of Hennepin County Government. The library headquarters are in the Ridgedale Library in suburban Minnetonka. The library system has an eleven-member advisory Library Board appointed by the Hennepin County Board of Commissioners. It is a member of the Metropolitan Library Service Agency, a consortium of eight Twin Cities library systems.

History 
Minneapolis Public Library was founded in 1885 with the establishment of the Minneapolis Public Library Board by an amendment of the Minneapolis city charter. Minneapolis Public Library's first building was the Main Library, opened in 1889. Minneapolis Public Library later added community library branches to supplement the main library. The first branch was North Branch, established in 1890, more branches in south and east Minneapolis followed, and the system grew with the city.

Hennepin County Library started in 1922 as a horse-drawn "bookmobile" to areas outside the core city of Minneapolis. The system saw a large increase in use in the period between 1950 and 1980 as more people moved into suburban areas of the county. By 1952 there were 24 libraries in the system; additional city libraries, such as Hopkins, were incorporated into the county system. Hennepin County Library opened its first area library, Southdale, in 1973. In the early 1970s plans were in place to merge the Minneapolis Public Library with the Hennepin County Library. However, the Minneapolis library system reconsidered, and merger plans were put on hold. Ultimately, the two library systems reached an agreement, and the merger was finalized on January 1, 2008, under the name of Hennepin County Library.

Branches

Minneapolis

Suburban Hennepin County

City locations

Bookmobile 
The Hennepin County Free Library started operating a bookmobile (then called a book wagon) in 1922.

Library directors 
 Gratia Countryman, 1922–1925
 Ethel Berry, 1925–1947
 Helen Young, 1947–1969
 Robert H. Rohlf, 1969–1994
 Charles M. Brown, 1994–2004
 Amy Ryan, 2005–2008
 Lois Langer Thompson, 2009–2018
 Janet Mills (interim), 2018-2020
 Chad Helton, August 24, 2020 - February 25, 2022
 Dan Rogan (Interim), February 25, 2022 - Ongoing

References

External links 

 Hennepin County Library
 Hennepin County Library merger page (Archive)
 History of the Hennepin County Library

 
County library systems in Minnesota
Education in Hennepin County, Minnesota
1885 establishments in Minnesota